Steve Hayden is a well-known figure in the field of advertising. He is the Vice Chairman and Chief Creative Officer of Ogilvy Worldwide. Hayden is one of the most important figures of the late twentieth century advertising, leading creative teams at both Chiat/Day and BBDO on the Apple Computer account.

Early life (1947–1968)
Stephen Edward Hayden was born on May 21, 1947 in St. Louis, Missouri.  His father was an internist and his mother was an opera singer.  He was the youngest of four sons.  In 1949, when Steve was two years old, his family relocated to San Jose, California where his father was the first internist in the area and eventually ran the O'Connor Hospital there.  At 14, Steve was sent to boarding school at the Interlochen Center for the Arts where he studied cello (and where he now serves as chairman of the board of trustees).  After graduating from high school at Interlochen, he moved to Los Angeles to go to school at University of Southern California.  He graduated in 1968 with a degree in English.

From first jobs to Steve Jobs (1969–1994)
Hayden launched his career in Detroit as a copywriter on the General Motors corporate account. When he returned to California, he divided his attention between advertising and television scriptwriting (for Welcome Back, Kotter), eventually focusing on advertising. After honing his craft at a number of agencies on a variety of accounts, Steve was recruited to Chiat-Day where he and Lee Clow made advertising history as co-creators of the breakthrough 1984 Orwellian take-off campaign for Apple Inc.

In the late 1970s, when Chiat picked up the Apple account through the acquisition of Regis McKenna's advertising practice, computers were widely considered to be obscure and expensive machines for use by technical professionals and large organizations.

Under Hayden's leadership, Apple hired New York talk show personality Dick Cavett as a spokesman and put Apple commercials on mass-audience television programming.

In 1986, Hayden moved to BBDO to become the Chairman and CEO of West Coast operations.  Apple had fired Chiat/Day not long after Steve Jobs was tossed out after an attempt boardroom coup.  Hayden said that the management team led by John Sculley "loved the advertising but hated the agency" and Sculley encouraged BBDO head Phil Dusenberry to hire Hayden away – which he did.  The Hayden-led BBDO managed to hold on to the tempestuous Apple account for more than a decade, winning hundreds of awards for creative excellence and dozens more for effectiveness (including the Grand Effie for the launch of the Apple Powerbook).

BBDO helped Apple become the #1 manufacturer of personal computers in the world, reclaiming the lead from IBM and Compaq in late 1992.  The agency tripled in size during Hayden's tenure.

In 1994, Hayden moved to Ogilvy to head the IBM account – which had moved to Ogilvy in the single largest account consolidation in advertising history.  Many pundits believed IBM was doomed and should be broken up and sold off – but then-CEO Lou Gerstner believed that IBM's greatest strength was as a whole.  It was Ogilvy's job to give voice to a future-facing IBM and change the perception of a brand that was widely seen to be a dinosaur.

Eventually, the success on IBM propelled Ogilvy to a decade of growth and prosperity.  And Hayden contributed to award-winning work for such diverse clients as American Express, Kodak, Motorola, Dove, Cisco and SAP.

Creative contributions
He was the co-creator – along with Lee Clow – of Apple Inc.'s 1984 commercial that launched the Macintosh.

He also led the team that created and launched IBM's award-winning e-business campaign.

He and his team at Ogilvy created the "Hello Moto" campaign for Motorola.

Notes

External links
Ogilvy Worldwide biography
CMO Magazine, Interview of Steve Hayden
Hansen, Liane. "A Look Back at Apple's Super Ad: Landmark 1984 Spot Smashed 'Big Brother,' Launched the Mac." NPR, February 1, 2004. (Steve Hayden interview)

Apple Inc. advertising
Living people
1947 births